Woldenberg may refer to:

Geography
 German name of Dobiegniew, a town in western Poland
 Woldenberg Park, a park in New Orleans, Louisiana

People
 Lords (Counts) of Woldenberg ("Von Wolhdenberg")
 José Woldenberg Karakowski (born 1952, Monterrey, Nuevo León), Mexican sociologist
 Malcolm Woldenberg (1896-1982), Canadian-born American businessman and philanthropist
 The Goldring/Woldenberg Institute of Southern Jewish Life

See also 
 
 Waldenberg, Waldenberger